"20th Century Boy" is a song by T. Rex, written by Marc Bolan, released as a stand-alone single on 2 March 1973.  

It entered in the UK Singles Chart at number 3, on 10 March 1973 and peaked three weeks in a row at that position. It stayed a total of nine weeks in the UK Chart.

"20th Century Boy" was not featured on the album Tanx, released at the same time in early March. It was later added as a bonus track in the reissues of Tanx from year 1985 and on all the following versions released since. The song returned to the UK Top 20 in 1991, peaking at No. 13, after being used in a TV commercial for Levi's starring Brad Pitt. The song was also used in the opening of the 2016 film The Purge: Election Year.

Recording

"20th Century Boy"
"20th Century Boy" was recorded on 3 December 1972 in Toshiba Recording Studios in Tokyo, Japan at a session that ran between 3:00p.m. and 1:30a.m.

Backing vocals, hand claps, acoustic guitar and saxophones were recorded in England when T. Rex returned to the country after their tour.

The single version of the track fades out at three minutes and 39 seconds; however, the multi-track master reveals that the song ended in nearly a full three minutes' worth of jamming. A rough mix of the full-length version can be found on the Bump 'n' Grind compilation.

According to Marc Bolan, the lyrics are based on quotes taken from notable celebrities such as Muhammad Ali. This can be seen through the inclusion of the line "sting like a bee", which is taken from one of Ali's 1969 speeches.

Although the lyrical content of a lot of Marc Bolan's songs is ambiguous, analysis of the multi-track recordings of "20th Century Boy" reveals the first line of the song to be "Friends say it's fine, friends say it's good/Everybody says it's just like Robin Hood," and not the often misquoted "...just like rock 'n' roll."

"Free Angel"
"Free Angel" was recorded during the first session for the Tanx album, between 1 and 4 August 1972. The single was mixed for release at Air Studios on 16 December 1972.

Track listing
 "20th Century Boy"
 "Free Angel"

Charts

Certifications

Covers and renditions

Chalk Circle version
Canadian rock band Chalk Circle covered "20th Century Boy" in 1987.

Def Leppard version

English hard rock band Def Leppard covered the song on their 2006 album, Yeah!, which features cover versions of 1970s rock hits. It was released as the third and final single from the album, on 21 August 2006. The band used the song extensively as promotion for including two TV appearances and a regular rotation in the setlist of their 2006 Yeah! Tour. Def Leppard performed "20th Century Boy" on The Tonight Show with Jay Leno on 23 May 2006 two days before performing the song with Queen's Brian May on VH1 Rock Honors broadcast on 31 May.

Other versions 
 Post-punk band Siouxsie and the Banshees covered "20th Century Boy" as the b-side of their 1979 single "The Staircase (Mystery)".
 American rock band The Replacements covered the song for the Let It Be sessions in 1983. The song was included as a bonus track on the Deluxe Edition of Let It Be in 2008.
 In 1999, David Bowie and Placebo performed the song live at the Brit Awards at the London Arena.
 Also in 1999, Swedish hard rock band Drain STH covered the song for the Detroit Rock City (film) soundtrack.
 American rock band Scott Weiland and the Wildabouts covered the song on their 2015 album, Blaster. Weiland described the track as "the coolest, most current take on a classic glam-rock song."
 Australian band Skulker covered the song as the last track on their Too Fat For Tahiti album.
 In 2011, rock band Powerman 5000 released a cover of the song on their album Copies, Clones & Replicants

References

1973 singles
1973 songs
T. Rex (band) songs
Chalk Circle (Canadian band) songs
Def Leppard songs
Song recordings produced by Tony Visconti
Songs written by Marc Bolan